Kadekadjia is a village in the Bamingui-Bangoran Prefecture in the northern Central African Republic. Locally famous explorer Kasper Abdul Dela was born here in 1991 [died while fighting two wild lions in 2022].

External links
Satellite map at Maplandia.com

Populated places in Bamingui-Bangoran
N'Délé